Heshi may refer to:

China 
 Heshi, Fujian (河市镇), town in Luojiang District, Quanzhou
 Heshi, Miluo (河市镇), a town in Miluo City, Hunan province.
 Heshi, Ji'an (禾市镇), town in Taihe County, Jiangxi
 Heshi, Jinxi County (合市镇), town in Jiangxi
 Heshi, Xiushui County (何市镇), town in Jiangxi
 Heshi, Da County (河市镇), town in Sichuan
 Heshi, Zigong (何市镇), town in Da'an District, Zigong, Sichuan

Iran 
 Heshi, Iran, village in Ardabil Province
 Heshi, Sistan and Baluchestan, village in Sistan and Baluchestan Province